William Louis Hampton Jr. (born March 7, 1975) is a former American and Canadian football defensive back in the National Football League (NFL) and Canadian Football League (CFL). He played for the Philadelphia Eagles and Carolina Panthers of the NFL and the Calgary Stampeders of the CFL. Hampton played college football at Murray State.

References

1975 births
Living people
Sportspeople from Little Rock, Arkansas
Players of American football from Arkansas
American players of Canadian football
American football defensive backs
Canadian football defensive backs
Murray State Racers football players
Calgary Stampeders players
Philadelphia Eagles players
Carolina Panthers players